Jack Spicer (January 30, 1925 – August 17, 1965) was an American poet often identified with the San Francisco Renaissance. In 2009, My Vocabulary Did This to Me: The Collected Poetry of Jack Spicer won the American Book Award for poetry. He spent most of his writing-life in San Francisco.

Early life
Born as John Lester Spicer on January 30, 1925 in Los Angeles, to parents Dorothy Clause and John Lovely Spicer.

He graduated from Fairfax High School in 1942, and attended the University of Redlands from 1943 to 1945. While attending the University of Redlands, he became friends with Warren Christopher. After graduation he lived in Los Angeles briefly, and worked as a movie extra and a private investigator.

Berkeley 
Spicer ended up in Berkeley, and lived in a boarding house alongside Philip K. Dick. He spent the years 1945 to 1950; and from 1952 to 1955 at the University of California, Berkeley, where he began writing, doing work as a research-linguist, and publishing some poetry (though he disdained publishing). In 1950, he refused to sign a "loyalty oath" during a time of McCarthyism.

During this time he searched out fellow poets, but it was through his alliance with Robert Duncan and Robin Blaser that Spicer forged a new kind of poetry, and together they referred to their common work as the Berkeley Renaissance. The three, who were all gay, also educated younger poets in their circle about their "queer genealogy", Rimbaud, Lorca, and other gay writers.  Spicer's poetry of this period is collected in One Night Stand and Other Poems (1980). His Imaginary Elegies, later collected in Donald Allen's The New American Poetry 1945-1960 anthology, were written around this time.

San Francisco 
In 1954, he co-founded the Six Gallery in San Francisco, which soon became famous as the scene of the October 1955 Six Gallery reading that launched the West Coast Beat movement. In 1955, Spicer moved to New York City and then to Boston, where he worked for a time in the Rare Book Room of Boston Public Library. Blaser was also in Boston at this time, and the pair made contact with a number of local poets, including John Wieners, Stephen Jonas, and Joe Dunn.

Spicer returned to San Francisco in 1956 and started working on After Lorca. This book represented a major change in direction for two reasons. Firstly, he came to the conclusion that stand-alone poems (which Spicer referred to as his one-night stands) were unsatisfactory and that henceforth he would compose serial poems. In fact, he wrote to Blaser that 'all my stuff from the past (except the Elegies and Troilus) looks foul to me.' Secondly, in writing After Lorca, he began to practice what he called "poetry as dictation". His interest in the work of Federico García Lorca, especially as it involved the cante jondo ideal, also brought him near the poetics of the deep image group. The Troilus referred to was Spicer's then unpublished play of that name. The play finally appeared in print in 2004, edited by Aaron Kunin, in issue 3 of No - A Journal of the Arts.

In 1957, Spicer ran a workshop called Poetry as Magic at San Francisco State College, which was attended by Duncan, Helen Adam, James Broughton, Joe Dunn, Jack Gilbert, and George Stanley. He also participated in, and sometimes hosted, Blabbermouth Night at a literary bar called The Place. This was a kind of contest of improvised poetry and encouraged Spicer's view of poetry as being dictated to the poet.

Spicer refused to have his work copyrighted, and after 1960, Spicer refused to publish his work outside of California. He considered City Lights Bookstore a tourist destination, and boycotted selling his work there. However he failed to be able to hold down a job and after he was poor; by 1964 he started selling books at City Lights.

Death and legacy
After many years of alcohol abuse, Spicer fell into a pre-hepatic coma in his apartment building elevator, and later died aged 40 in the poverty ward of San Francisco General Hospital on August 17, 1965.

Spicer's view of the role of language in the process of writing poetry was probably the result of his knowledge of modern pre-Chomskyan linguistics and his experience as a research-linguist at Berkeley. In the legendary Vancouver lectures he elucidated his ideas on "transmissions" (dictations) from the Outside, using the comparison of the poet as crystal-set or radio receiving transmissions from outer space, or Martian transmissions. The radio oracle derived from Cocteau's film Orphée, often cited by Spicer in his lectures. Although seemingly far-fetched, his view of language as "furniture", through which the transmissions negotiate their way, is grounded in the structuralist linguistics of Zellig Harris and Charles Hockett. (In fact, the poems of his final book, Language, refer to linguistic concepts such as morphemes and graphemes). As such, Spicer is acknowledged as a precursor and early inspiration for the Language poets. However, many working poets today list Spicer in their succession of precedent figures. 

Since the posthumous publication of The Collected Books of Jack Spicer (1975, 1st ed.), his popularity and influence have steadily risen, affecting poetry throughout the United States, Canada, and Europe. The Collected Books of Jack Spicer (1975, 1ed.) started with Spicer works made in and after 1957, and specifically did not include his earlier works per Spicer's requests. Spicer's works created pre-1975 were published in One Night Stand and Other Poems, with Donald Allen as editor.

Other posthumous publications of Spicer's work have taken place including, The Tower of Babel: Jack Spicer's Detective Novel (1994); The House That Jack Built: The Collected Lectures of Jack Spicer (1998), edited by Peter Gizzi; Poet, Be Like God: Jack Spicer and the San Francisco Renaissance (1998) by Lewis Ellingham and Kevin Killian; My Vocabulary Did This to Me: The Collected Poetry of Jack Spicer (2008) edited by Peter Gizzi and Kevin Killian, which won the American Book Award in 2009; and After Spicer: Critical Essays (2011) edited by John Emil Vincent, a collection of critical essays.

Bibliography  
A select list of publications authored by Spicer, in order by ascending date published.

References

Further reading
Davidson, Michael (1977). Incarnations of Jack Spicer: Heads of the Town up to the Aether. Boundary 2, 6(1), 103-134. doi:10.2307/302472

 

Herndon, James. (1973) Everything as Expected, San Francisco, California:
Katz, Daniel. The Poetry of Jack Spicer. Edinburgh: Edinburgh University Press, 2013, ISBN 978-0-7486-4549-7
 This is a collection of essays, poetry, and documents celebrating Spicer.
Spicer, Jack. Jack Spicer’s Beowulf, Part 1, edited by David Hadbawnik & Sean Reynolds, introduction by David Hadbawnik, Lost and Found: The CUNY Poetics Documents Initiative, New York, 2011
Spicer, Jack. Jack Spicer’s Beowulf, Part II, edited by David Hadbawnik & Sean Reynolds, afterword by Sean Reynolds, Lost and Found: The CUNY Poetics Documents Initiative, New York, 2011
Tallman, Warren. (1992) In the Midst. Vancouver, Canada: Talonbooks
Vincent, John Emil, eds. (2011) After Spicer: Critical Essays. Middletown, Connecticut: Wesleyan University Press, ISBN 978-0-8195-6942-4

External links

Jack Spicer at the EPC
Jack Spicer at PennSound
Guide to the Jack Spicer Papers at The Bancroft Library, University of California, Berkeley
Jack Spicer papers, 1938-1973 at Stuart A. Rose Manuscript, Archives, and Rare Book Library, Emory University
Records of Jack Spicer at Simon Fraser University Library Special Collections and Rare Books
Vocabulary Lesson by Katherine Montgomery, an essay on Jack Spicer. Winner of 2006 Hopwood Award for creative nonfiction
Profile of Jack Spicer on Poets.org includes links to further readings, related prose including information on Other San Francisco Renaissance Poets, and some Spicer poems including "A Book Of Music", "Improvisations On A Sentence By Poe", "Orfeo", "Psychoanalysis: An Elegy",

1925 births
1965 deaths
Writers from Los Angeles
University of Redlands alumni
Beat Generation poets
American gay writers
American LGBT poets
LGBT people from California
20th-century American poets
American male poets
Writers from the San Francisco Bay Area
American Book Award winners
20th-century American male writers
Burials at Cypress Lawn Memorial Park
20th-century American LGBT people
Gay poets